Yao Jing (born April 1969) is a Chinese diplomat. Previously he served as Chinese Ambassador to Afghanistan between 2015 and 2017 and Chinese Ambassador to Pakistan between 2017 and 2020.

Biography
Born in April 1969, Yao entered the Ministry of Foreign Affairs in 1991. He held various posts at the Ministry of Foreign Affairs until he was appointed Chinese Ambassador to Afghanistan in October 2015. On October 11, 2017, President of Afghanistan Ashraf Ghani bestowed its "Said Dzemarudin Afghani" medal upon him for his efforts to promote China-Afghanistan bilateral relations. On December 14, 2017, he was appointed and then approved by 12th Standing Committee of the National People's Congress as the Chinese Ambassador to Pakistan, replacing Sun Weidong.

In January 2021, he was appointed director of the Foreign Affairs Office of the People's Government of Xinjiang Uygur Autonomous Region.

References

External links

1969 births
Living people
Ambassadors of China to Afghanistan
Ambassadors of China to Pakistan